Kargalin (also Romanized as Kargalīn) is a village in Saidabad Rural District, in the Central District of Savojbolagh County, Alborz Province, Iran. At the 2006 census, its population was 640, in 169 families.

References 

Populated places in Savojbolagh County